Punt dal Gall is an arch dam located in Livigno valley, 10.5 km northeast of the Italian town of Livigno. It lies at the border between the Italian region of Lombardy and the Swiss canton of Grisons.

As of June 2008, the dam's crown holds a toll that takes payment for crossing the Munt La Schera Tunnel, which connects Livigno and the Engadin valley.

References

Dams in Italy
Arch dams
Dams completed in 1968
Zernez